"Money Ain't a Thang" is the second single from rapper Jermaine Dupri's 1998 album Life in 1472.  It features rapper Jay-Z and appears as a bonus track on his album Vol. 2... Hard Knock Life. It is produced by Dupri, who samples "Weak at the Knees" by Steve Arrington for the track's beat.  It can be found on two of Jay-Z's greatest hits compilations: Chapter One: Greatest Hits and Greatest Hits. In addition, it was nominated for Best Rap Performance by a Duo or Group at the 41st Grammy Awards in 1999.

The title of "Money Ain't a Thang" appears as "Money Ain't a Thing" on the vinyl single, but not on the CD single or any album it appears on.

Formats and track listings

CD
 "Money Ain't a Thang (Radio Edit)" (4:16)
 "Money Ain't a Thang (Instrumental)" (4:16)
 "Money Ain't a Thang (Acappella)" (4:15)
 "Money Ain't a Thang (Call Out Hook No. 1)" (:10)
 "Money Ain't a Thang (Call Out Hook No. 2)" (:05)

Vinyl

A-Side
 "Money Ain't a Thing (LP Version)" (4:18)
 "Money Ain't a Thing (Instrumental)" (4:16)

B-Side
 "Money Ain't a Thing (Radio Edit)" (4:16)
 "Money Ain't a Thing (A Cappella)" (4:15)

Charts

See also
List of songs recorded by Jay-Z

References

1998 singles
Jay-Z songs
Jermaine Dupri songs
Music videos directed by Darren Grant
Song recordings produced by Jermaine Dupri
Songs written by Jay-Z
Songs written by Jermaine Dupri